The Ibrahim-al-Ibrahim Mosque, also known as the King Fahd bin Abdulaziz al-Saud Mosque or the Mosque of the Custodian of the Two Holy Mosques, is a mosque located at Europa Point in the British overseas territory of Gibraltar, a peninsula connected to southern Spain. The mosque faces south towards the Strait of Gibraltar and Morocco several kilometres away.

Construction
The building was a gift from King Fahd of Saudi Arabia and took two years to build at a cost of around £5 million. It was officially inaugurated on 8 August 1997.

It is the southernmost mosque in continental Europe, and is one of the largest mosques in a non-Muslim country.

Description 
The Ibrahim-al-Ibrahim Mosque, also known as the King Fahad Bin Abdulaziz Al Saud Mosque, is one of the most often visited places in Gibraltar. It is said to be the largest mosque to exist in a non-Islamic country. First impressions of the mosque are fairly simple and bland, but the design is very complex and well thought out. Its first floor comprises six classrooms, a conference hall, a library, a kitchen, bathroom, housing for the caretaker, morgue, offices for administration purposes, and the Imam's house. The main prayer hall is located on the second floor of the building. The ceiling is made up of nine solid brass chandeliers, that cannot be missed when entering the praying area. One of the chandelier is hung from the enormous dome that is at an extreme height. The walls are imported marble stretching across the whole mosque. A women's prayer hall is located on the lower level, along with a nursery, that overlooks the main prayer hall. What makes this mosque special is the location; it is located in between many mountains that brings the beauty of the mosque to light. The Ibrahim-al-Ibrahim Mosque is used on a daily basis by Muslims living in Gibraltar and is open to the public during the day.

Complex
The mosque complex also contains a school, library, and lecture hall. It is the only purpose-built mosque in Gibraltar to serve the Muslims in the territory who number over 1,000: around 4% of Gibraltar's total population.

References

1997 establishments in Gibraltar
Mosques completed in 1997
Mosques in Gibraltar